Boardman is a town in Columbus County, North Carolina, United States. Per the 2020 census, the population was 166.

Geography
Boardman is located at  (34.439790, -78.948495).

Demographics

2020 census

Note: the US Census treats Hispanic/Latino as an ethnic category. This table excludes Latinos from the racial categories and assigns them to a separate category. Hispanics/Latinos can be of any race.

2000 Census
As of the census of 2000, there were 202 people, 79 households, and 54 families residing in the town. The population density was 64.8 people per square mile (25.0/km2). There were 89 housing units at an average density of 28.6 per square mile (11.0/km2). The racial makeup of the town was 54.46% White, 44.55% African American, 0.99% from other races. Hispanic or Latino of any race were 0.99% of the population.

There were 79 households, out of which 22.8% had children under the age of 18 living with them, 39.2% were married couples living together, 24.1% had a female householder with no husband present, and 30.4% were non-families. 29.1% of all households were made up of individuals, and 13.9% had someone living alone who was 65 years of age or older. The average household size was 2.56 and the average family size was 3.15.

In the town, the population was spread out, with 23.8% under the age of 18, 9.4% from 18 to 24, 28.7% from 25 to 44, 22.3% from 45 to 64, and 15.8% who were 65 years of age or older. The median age was 38 years. For every 100 females, there were 69.7 males. For every 100 females age 18 and over, there were 69.2 males.

The median income for a household in the town was $20,500, and the median income for a family was $28,333. Males had a median income of $25,500 versus $20,417 for females. The per capita income for the town was $10,339. About 19.0% of families and 27.6% of the population were below the poverty line, including 45.5% of those under the age of eighteen and 28.6% of those 65 or over.

References

Towns in North Carolina
Towns in Columbus County, North Carolina